Ayreonauts Only is the first compilation album by Dutch progressive metal project Ayreon by Arjen Anthony Lucassen, released in 2000. Although categorized as a compilation album, it consists only of previously unreleased material, with alternate versions of Ayreon songs with different singers, demos, and of the song "Cold Metal" from Lucassen's then-upcoming project Ambeon.

The album's name comes from the fact that, according to Lucassen, it is "intended primarily for die-hard Ayreon fans". It is notable for featuring vocals by Ian Parry and Leon Goewie, two former bandmates of Lucassen on his former band Vengeance.

Production 

The songs contained in the album are for the most part either demos or re-recordings of older Ayreon songs.

"Into the Black Hole", "Out of the White Hole" and 'Through the Wormhole" are three songs from Universal Migrator Part 2: Flight of the Migrator. For the first song, Lucassen wanted Bruce Dickinson from Iron Maiden; however due to Dickinson's busy schedule, it was unsure until the very last moment whether or not if he could come to Lucassen's studio and record it. As Damian Wilson came into Lucassen's studio to provide vocals in "And the Druids Turn to Stone" for Universal Migrator Part 1: The Dream Sequencer, Lucassen had the idea of recording a version of "Into the Black Hole" with Wilson, in case Dickinson would turn out to be unavailable. Dickinson was featured on the album version of the song, while the version present on Ayreonauts Only is the one with Wilson, and still features Lana Lane's backing vocals. For two other songs, Lucassen asked his friends Robert Soeterboek and Ian Parry (who had previously sung for him in Ayreon and Vengeance respectively) to provide guide vocals for the song's actual singers, respectively Timo Kotipelto and Fabio Lione; those guide vocals are the ones used in Ayreonauts Only.

"Carpe Diem" is 1992 demo by Lucassen's short-lived band Plant Nine (soon renamed Planet Nine and disbanded), with Robert Soeterboek on vocals, Peter Vink (who would later be a member of Lucassen's project Star One) on bass, and Cleem Determeyer on keyboards. Due to a dysfunctioning tape recorder, Lucassen had to play all guitar parts in one take, and used a drum machine. He eventually used the song as the basis of "Chaos", the opening track of Flight of the Migrator, with this time real drums played by Ed Warby. Another song from that album, "the New Migrator", was originally composed by Lucassen and Parry (from Vengeance) during that time.

"Temple of the Cat" is the only single released from the album The Dream Sequencer, however Lucassen always felt unsatisfied with the final result. The version on this album is a newly recorded version, featuring Astrid van der Veen of his newly created band Ambeon. Lucassen stated "in my opinion this acoustic version is even better than the original. This is the way I wanted this song to sound." On the album Into the Electric Castle, the parts of the character Hippie were originally sung by the singer Mouse, but due to "unforeseen problems", his vocals were not used and Lucassen had to sing the part himself. "Original Hippie's Amazing Trip" is a medley of the parts sung by the character, but as sung by Mouse. The voice of Anneke van Giersbergen from the original version is also present.

"Beyond the Last Horizon" is a newly, "more guitar-orientated new version with a real drummer" of the song of the same name from Actual Fantasy, featuring Gary Hughes of Ten on vocals. All the parts were re-recorded, except the guitar and synthesizer solo.

"The Charm of the Seer", Eyes of Time", and "Nature's Dance" are previously unreleased demo versions of the eponymous song from The Final Experiment, with different singers: The first and third songs feature Lucassen, and the second features Leon Goewie (former member of Vengeance with Lucassen and Parry).

Track listing

Personnel 

 Vocalists
 Lana Lane - vocals on "Into the Black Hole"
 Damian Wilson (ex-Threshold) - vocals on "Into the Black Hole"
 Robert Soeterboek - vocals on "Out of the White Hole" and "Beyond the Last Horizon"
 Ian Parry (ex-Vengeance) - vocals on "Through the Wormhole"
 Astrid van der Veen (Ambeon) - vocals on "Temple of the Cat" and "Cold Metal"
 Mouse - vocals on "Original Hippie's Amazing Trip"
 Anneke van Giersbergen (The Gathering) - vocals on "Original Hippie's Amazing Trip"
 Edward Reekers (Kayak) - vocals on "Original Hippie's Amazing Trip"
 Gary Hughes (Ten - vocals on "Beyond the Last Horizon"
 Okkie Huijsdens - vocals on "Beyond the Last Horizon"
 Arjen Anthony Lucassen - vocals on "The Charm of the Seer" and "Nature's Dance"
 Leon Goewie (ex-Vengeance) - vocals on "Eyes of Time"

 Instrumentalists and production
 Arjen Anthony Lucassen - guitars, bass guitars, keyboards, production, mixing
 Peter Vink - Bass on "Carpe Diem"
 Cleem Determeyer - keyboards on "Carpe Diem"
 Rene Merkelbach - keyboard
 Ernst van Ee - drums
 Stephen van Haestregt - drums on "Beyond the Last Horizon" and "Cold Metal"

References 

Ayreon compilation albums
2000 compilation albums